On June 4, 1952 a by-election for one of the two seats of the Ahmedabad City nos. VI, VII constituency of the Bombay Legislative Assembly was held. The by-election was called following the resignation of Somnath Prabhashankar Dave. 

The Indian National Congress fielded the Chief Minister Morarji Desai whilst the Communist Party of India fielded Dinkar Mehta. Desai won the seat with 18,583 votes (61.08%) against 11,841 (38.92%) votes for Mehta.

References

By-elections in India
1952 elections in India
State Assembly elections in Gujarat